The following are lists of words in the English language that are known as "loanwords" or "borrowings," which are derived from other languages.

For Old English-derived words, see List of English words of Old English origin.

English words of African origin
List of English words of Afrikaans origin
List of South African English regionalisms
List of South African slang words
List of English words from indigenous languages of the Americas
List of English words of Arabic origin
List of Arabic star names
List of English words of Australian Aboriginal origin
List of English words of Brittonic origin
Lists of English words of Celtic origin
List of English words of Chinese origin
List of English words of Czech origin
List of English words of Dravidian origin (Kannada, Malayalam, Tamil, Telugu)
List of English words of Dutch origin
List of English words of Afrikaans origin
List of South African slang words
List of place names of Dutch origin
Australian places with Dutch names
List of English words of Etruscan origin
List of English words of Finnish origin
List of English words of French origin
Glossary of ballet, mostly French words
List of French expressions in English
List of English words with dual French and Anglo-Saxon variations
List of pseudo-French words adapted to English
List of English Latinates of Germanic origin
List of English words of Gaulish origin
List of German expressions in English
List of pseudo-German words adapted to English
English words of Greek origin (a discussion rather than a list)
List of Greek morphemes used in English
List of English words of Hawaiian origin
List of English words of Hebrew origin
List of English words of Hindi or Urdu origin
List of English words of Hungarian origin
List of English words of Indian origin
List of English words of Indonesian origin, including from Javanese, Malay (Sumatran) Sundanese, Papuan (West Papua), Balinese, Dayak and other local languages in Indonesia
List of English words of Irish origin
List of Irish words used in the English language
List of English words of Italian origin
List of Italian musical terms used in English
List of English words of Japanese origin
List of English words of Korean origin
List of Latin words with English derivatives
List of English words of Malay origin
List of English words of Māori origin
List of English words of Niger-Congo origin
List of English words of Old Norse origin
List of English words of Persian origin
List of English words of Philippine origin
List of English words of Polish origin
List of English words of Polynesian origin
List of English words of Portuguese origin
List of English words of Romani origin
List of English words of Romanian origin
List of English words of Russian origin
List of English words of Sami origin
List of English words of Sanskrit origin
List of English words of Scandinavian origin (incl. Danish, Norwegian)
List of English words of Scots origin
List of English words of Scottish Gaelic origin
List of English words of Semitic origin
List of English words of Spanish origin
List of English words of Swedish origin
List of English words of Turkic origin
List of English words of Ukrainian origin
List of English words of Welsh origin
List of English words of Yiddish origin
List of English words of Zulu origin

See also 
 Anglicisation
 English terms with diacritical marks
 Inkhorn term
 Linguistic purism in English
 List of Germanic and Latinate equivalents in English
 List of Greek and Latin roots in English
 List of proposed etymologies of OK
List of Latin legal terms

References

External links 
 Ancient Egyptian Loan-Words in English
 List of etymologies of English words